The Adventures of Dollie is a 1908 American silent film directed by  D. W. Griffith.  It was Griffith's debut film as a director. A print of the film survives in the Library of Congress film archive. The film tells the story of a young girl who, after being kidnapped by a peddler, ends up trapped in a barrel as it floats downriver toward a waterfall.

Plot
On a beautiful summer day a father and mother take their daughter Dollie on an outing to the river. The mother refuses to buy a passing peddler's wares. The peddler tries to rob the mother, but the father rushes up and drives away the ruffian. The peddler then returns to his nearby camp and devises a plan. He and his female companion return and kidnap Dollie while her parents are distracted. A rescue party is quickly organized to find the girl, but the peddler and companion take her back their camp. They gag Dollie, put her in a wooden barrel, and seal its top before the rescue party arrives at the camp. Once the searchers leave, the peddler and his companion escape in their wagon. As the wagon crosses the river, the barrel falls into the water. Still sealed in the container, Dollie is swept downstream in dangerous currents. Soon a boy who is fishing along the riverbank finds the barrel, calls out to Dollie's frantic father to help him hoist it out of the water. The father unseals the barrel and daughter and parent are happily reunited.

Cast
 Arthur V. Johnson as Father
 Linda Arvidson as Mother
 Gladys Egan as Dollie
 Charles Inslee as Gypsy
 Madeline West as Gypsy's wife

See also
 List of American films of 1908
 1908 in film
 D. W. Griffith filmography

References

External links

 
 The Adventures of Dollie on YouTube
 

1908 films
1908 drama films
1908 short films
1908 directorial debut films
Surviving American silent films
Silent American drama films
American black-and-white films
American silent short films
Articles containing video clips
Films directed by D. W. Griffith
Films with screenplays by Stanner E.V. Taylor
Films shot in Connecticut
1900s American films
Films about Romani people